Mantalania is a genus of flowering plants belonging to the family Rubiaceae.

Its native range is Madagascar.

Species:

Mantalania capuronii 
Mantalania longipedunculata 
Mantalania sambiranensis

References

Rubiaceae
Rubiaceae genera